Miguel de La Guardia is a Spanish chemist, who is active in the field of analytical chemistry; he is a full professor of the University of Valencia (UV). He is a member of the editorial board of Spectroscopy Letters, Ciencia (Venezuela), Journal of the Brazilian Chemical Society, Bioimpacts (Iran) and SOP Transactions on Nano-technology, and editor-in-chief of Elsevier's Microchemical Journal.

References

Literature 
 David Pozo. Entrevista a Miguel de La Guardia, catedrático de Química Analítica de la Universidad de Valencia // Interempresas. — 2009. — 16 enero.

Web-sources 
 
 

Living people
Year of birth missing (living people)
Spanish chemists
Academic staff of the University of Valencia